Chrysippus was the name of several Greek people:

Mythical
Chrysippus of Elis (or of Pisa), illegitimate son of Pelops abducted by Laius
Chrysippus, a son of Aegyptus killed by the Danaid Chrysippe
Chrysippus, a son of Aeolus
Chrysippus, eponymous founder of Chrysippa in Cilicia (Stephanus of Byzantium s. v. Χρύσιππα)
see Chrysippus (Greek myth)

Historical
Chrysippus of Soli (c.280-c.207 BC) Stoic philosopher
Chrysippus of Cnidos (4th century BC) Greek physician
Chrysippus of Tyana, Greek writer on gastronomy
Chrysippus of Cappadocia (5th century AD) Greek religious writer
Chrysippus of Mallus at the Council of Chalcedon

See also
Chrysippe
Danaus chrysippus, a species of butterfly